Guduvancheri is a suburb located in the southern part of Chennai city, Tamil Nadu, India. It has a railway station on the Chennai Beach–Chengalpattu section of the Chennai Suburban Railway Network. It is a municipality in Chengalpattu district, Tamil Nadu, India. It is also part of the Vandalur taluk  It lies in the southern part of Chennai metropolitan area. It has a lake known as the Guduvancheri lake and Nandivaram lake. It serves as the connecting hub between Chennai and Chengalpattu. It also lies on the major highway connecting Chennai with Kanyakumari, the southernmost point of the state and the country.

Transportation

By Rail
Guduvancheri is served by Guduvancheri railway station of Chennai suburban railway.

By Bus

Guduvancheri is well connected with roads. The National Highway 45 passes through this place. Guduvancheri is served by Guduvancheri bus stand which connects Chennai by Chennai metropolitan Transport Service buses and also connects various parts of Tamil Nadu by TNSTC buses.

Demographics
According to the 2011 census, Guduvancheri's population was 46,575.

See also
 Potheri
 SRM Institute of Science and Technology
 Valliammai Engineering College
 Kattankulathur
 Urapakkam

References

External links
 Avadi Guduvanchery Rail line
 Guduvanchery Rail line project is urged

Cities and towns in Chengalpattu district
Suburbs of Chennai